Lizihnei station is a light rail station of the Circular light rail of Kaohsiung Metro. It is located in Cianjhen District, Kaohsiung, Taiwan.

Station design
The station is a street-level station with two side platforms.

Around the station
 Kaohsiung Municipal Ruei-Siang Senior High School
 Qianzhen Civil Sports Center
 Lizinei Park
 Wu Jia Ziqiang Night Market

References

2015 establishments in Taiwan
Railway stations opened in 2015
Circular light rail stations